Strzelce Opolskie  is a town in southern Poland with 17,900 inhabitants (2019), situated in the Opole Voivodeship. It is the capital of Strzelce County.

Demographics
Strzelce Opolskie is one of the biggest centers of German minority in Poland.

Transport
The town is located along the major rail line which joins Gliwice and Opole. Until 1999, there was a branch line connecting Strzelce Opolskie with Kędzierzyn Koźle. It closed as part of PKP's cost-cutting measures, although the rails still (2006) remain in site.

The town is located on the Polish National road No. 94, and the Voivodeship roads 409 and 426.

History

The settlement was mentioned in 13th-century documents, when it was part of Piast-ruled Poland. It received town rights probably in the 13th century. Local dukes of the Piast dynasty erected a castle in the town.

The town was annexed by Prussia in the 18th century, and then from 1871 to 1945 it was also part of Germany. In the 18th century, Strzelce Opolskie belonged to the tax inspection region of Prudnik. According to the German census of 1890, it had a population of 5,112, of which 500 (9.8%) were Poles. In the Upper Silesia plebiscite held in 1921, the residents were asked to choose between remaining in Germany and rejoining Poland, which just regained independence after World War I. In Groß Strehlitz, 85.7% of the votes were cast in favour of remaining in Germany.

In a secret Sicherheitsdienst report from 1934, the town was named one of the main centers of the Polish movement in western Upper Silesia. Polish activists were persecuted intensively since 1937. In April and May 1939, multiple German attacks on Poles took place in the town. Nazi German militants attacked the actors of the Polish theater from Katowice and the gathered Polish public, and demolished the theater hall of the Polish bank. The Hitler Youth devastated the headquarters of Polish organizations, Polish enterprises (bank and cooperative) and houses of local Polish activists. In August and September 1939, the Germans carried out arrests of prominent local Poles, including chairmen of the Polish bank, cooperative and local branch of the "Sokół" Polish Gymnastic Society, and confiscated the assets of the Polish bank. During World War II, Nazi Germany operated a detention center where it would send prisoners to forced labour. Many died from exhaustion and/or starvation. Among the prisoners were Poles arrested for rescuing Jews from the Holocaust. The Germans also operated the E365 labour subcamp of the Stalag VIII-B/344 prisoner-of-war camp at the local lime quarry, and a forced labour camp for Jews. After the defeat of Germany in the war in 1945, the town became again part of Poland.

Sports
The local football club is Piast Strzelce Opolskie with men and women sections. Both sections compete in the lower leagues.

Notable people
Gustav Meyer (1850-1900), linguist and notable Albanologist
Helmuth Förster (1889–1965), general
Heinz Kokott (1900–1976), general
Hermann Bix (1914–1986), officer
Erich Mende (1916–1998), politician
Piotr Domaradzki (1946–2015), journalist, essayist and historian
Mirosław Sekuła (born 1955), chemist and politician
Sławomir Szmal (born 1978), handball player

Twin towns – sister cities
See twin towns of Gmina Strzelce Opolskie.

Gallery

See also
Strzelce Opolskie Castle
Strzelce Opolskie railway station

References

External links
 Jewish Community in Strzelce Opolskie on Virtual Shtetl

Cities and towns in Opole Voivodeship
Strzelce County
Cities in Silesia